Balaghat tehsil is a fourth-order administrative and revenue division, a subdivision of third-order administrative and revenue division of Balaghat district of Madhya Pradesh.

Geography
Balaghat tehsil has an area of 638.99 sq kilometers. It is bounded by Mandla district in the north, Paraswada tehsil in the northeast, east and southeast, Kirnapur tehsil  in the south, Waraseoni tehsil in the southwest, Lalbarra tehsil in the west and Seoni district in the northwest.

See also 
Balaghat district

Citations

External links

Tehsils of Madhya Pradesh
Balaghat district